is a passenger railway station located in the city of Matsudo, Chiba Prefecture, Japan, operated by the private railway operator Shin-Keisei Electric Railway.

Lines
Yabashira Station is served by the Shin-Keisei Line, and is located 3.8 kilometers from the terminus of the line at Matsudo Station.

Station layout 
The station consists of a single island platform, with an elevated station building. The station is adjacent to, but not directly connected to the Shin-Yahashira Station of the JR East’s Musashino Line.

Platforms

History
Yabashira Station was opened on April 21, 1955. A new station building was completed in 2003.

Passenger statistics
In fiscal 2018, the station was used by an average of 45,631 passengers daily.

Surrounding area
 Shin-Yahashira Station ( Musashino Line)
Chiba West General Hospital
Matsudo City General Hospital
Matsudo City No. 6 Junior High School
 Matsudo City Kanfudai Elementary School

See also
 List of railway stations in Japan

References

External links

 Shin Keisei Railway Station information 

Railway stations in Japan opened in 1955
Railway stations in Chiba Prefecture
Matsudo